Mohd Nureizkhan bin Isa Japar is a Malaysian professional footballer who plays as a midfielder for Malaysia Super League club Sabah.

References

External links
Profile at Soccerway

Living people
Malaysian footballers
People from Labuan
Sabah F.C. (Malaysia) players
Association football midfielders
Year of birth missing (living people)